The Earth's Most Beloved Son (originally Cel mai iubit dintre pământeni) is a 1993 Romanian drama film, directed by Șerban Marinescu, based on the novel Cel mai iubit dintre pământeni by Marin Preda.

Cast 
 Ștefan Iordache – Victor Petrini
 Gheorghe Dinică – Securitate investigator
 Dorel Vișan – Guardian "Dumnezeu"
 Maia Morgenstern – Matilda
 Tora Vasilescu – Nineta
 Mircea Albulescu – inmate Grecul
 Victor Rebengiuc – apparatchik
 Valentin Uritescu – Dr. Marcu
 Colea Răutu – Traian Petrini
 Emil Hossu – Iustin Comănescu
 Mitică Popescu – Securitate officer
 Ștefan Bănică – rodent exterminator Belitu

References

External links 

1993 films
1993 drama films
Romanian drama films